Francisco García Calderón Landa (April 2, 1834 – September 21, 1905) was a lawyer and Provisional President of the Republic of Peru for a short seven-month period in 1881, during the War of the Pacific. García Calderón was a key figure in the final peace accords between Peru and Chile. Later in post-presidential career, in 1892, he was commissioned to arbitrate land disputes between Peru and Ecuador, which centered on the contested provinces of Mainas, Jaén and Tumbes. He was an academic as well, having authored a comprehensive history of the previously-mentioned contested provinces, as well as a monograph on Peruvian legislation titled, Diccionario de la Legislación Peruana.

Early life
Francisco García Calderón was born in Arequipa on April 2, 1834, as the son of Judge Doctor Eduardo García Calderón y Crespo and Ventura Landa y Guerola. He studied at the Colegio de la Independencia where he later worked as professor of Philosophy and Mathematics.

With his Diccionario de la Legislación Peruana he established his name as an eminent lawyer. He served as the President of the Constituent Congress in 1867. From 1868 to 1869 he served as Minister of Finance for a short period of time. He served as the President of the Senate from 1886 to 1887.

Personal life
His sons Francisco Garcia Calderon and Ventura Garcia Calderon became eminent intellectuals in Peru. Another son, Jose Garcia Calderon, also a writer and artist, died in 1916 the Battle of Verdun.

References

External links 
 Francisco Garcia Calderon Collection MSS 121. Special Collections & Archives, UC San Diego Library.

1834 births
1905 deaths
Peruvian people of Spanish descent
Presidents of Peru
Presidents of the Senate of Peru
Presidents of the Congress of the Republic of Peru
19th-century Peruvian lawyers
Peruvian Ministers of Economy and Finance
People from Arequipa